Colure, in astronomy, is either of the two principal meridians of the celestial sphere.

Equinoctial colure
The equinoctial colure is the meridian or great circle of the celestial sphere which passes through the celestial poles and the two equinoxes: the first point of Aries and the first point of Libra.

Solstitial colure
The solstitial colure is the meridian or great circle of the celestial sphere which passes through the poles and the two solstices: the first point of Cancer and the first point of Capricorn. There are several stars closely aligned with the solstitial colure: Pi Herculis, Delta Aurigae, and Theta Scorpii. This makes the solstitial colure point towards the North Celestial Pole and Polaris.

See also
 Celestial coordinate system
 Ecliptic
 Celestial sphere
 Right ascension
 Equinox
 Solstice

References

 
 
 
 
 Kaler, Jim. "Pi Aurigae." Pi Aurigae. N.p. 22 Feb. 2008. Web.

Astronomical coordinate systems